Live at the Apollo is a blues album by B.B. King and the Phillip Morris "Super Band" recorded at the famous Apollo Theater in Harlem, New York. It was awarded the 1992 Grammy Award for Best Traditional Blues Album.

Track listing
Side one
"When Love Comes to Town" (Paul David Hewson/ U2) - 4:40
"Sweet Sixteen" (B. B. King, Joe Josea) - 7:25
"The Thrill Is Gone" (Ravon Darnell, Roy Hawkins) - 3:33
"Ain't Nobody's Bizness" (Everett Robbins, Porter Grainger) - 2:43
"Paying the Cost to Be the Boss" (B. B. King) - 2:30

Side two
"All over Again" (Carl B. Adams, B. B. King) - 7:33
"Nightlife" (Willie Nelson) - 4:03
"Since I Met You Baby"  (Ivory Joe Hunter) - 3:55
"Guess Who" (Jo Ann Belvin) - 5:03
"Peace to the World" (Trade Marvin) - 2:51

Personnel
B.B. King - lead guitar, vocals
Jeff Clayton - alto saxophone
Jerry Dodgion - alto saxophone
Plas Johnson - tenor saxophone
Gary Smulyan - tenor saxophone
Ralph Moore - tenor saxophone 
Harry "Sweets" Edison - trumpet
James Morrison - trumpet
Joe Mosello - trumpet
Robin Eubanks - trombone
George Bohanon - trombone
Paul Faulise - trombone
Urbie Green - trombone
Ray Brown - bass
Kenny Burrell - guitar
Harold Jones - drums
Gene Harris - piano, conductor

References

B.B. King live albums
1991 live albums
Albums recorded at the Apollo Theater
Grammy Award for Best Traditional Blues Album